Edmund Donovan is an American theater, film, and television actor.

Donovan won the Drama Desk Award for Outstanding Actor in a Play, Lucille Lortel Award and Obie Award in 2020 for his role as Joe in Greater Clements by Samuel D. Hunter. He was nominated for the same award in 2019 for his role in Lewiston/Clarkston, another play by Hunter. His television credits include Hightown, Betty, High Fidelity, and Orange Is the New Black. He played Christopher in the 2015 film Akron, which won a number of awards at LGBT film festivals in 2015.

In 2021, Donovan played Jason in Second Stage Theatre's production of Lynn Nottage's Clyde's.

Donovan graduated from Boston University's College of Fine Arts in 2012 with a BFA in acting. In 2017 he received an MFA from the Yale School of Drama.

Filmography

Film

Television

Theater

Awards and nominations

References

External links 
 

Boston University alumni
Yale School of Drama alumni
Year of birth missing (living people)
Living people